This is a list of important publications in physics, organized by field.

Some reasons why a particular publication might be regarded as important:
Topic creator – A publication that created a new topic
Breakthrough – A publication that changed scientific knowledge significantly
Influence – A publication which has significantly influenced the world or has had a massive impact on the teaching of physics.

Applied physics

Accelerator physics

The Swedish physicist Gustav Ising was the first one to publish the basic concept of a linear accelerator (in this case, as part of a cathode ray tube).

The Norwegian physicist Rolf Widerøe took Ising's idea and expanded it. Later, he built the first operational linear accelerator.

These two articles describe the betatron concept and the first experimental data of a working betatron, built by Donald William Kerst.

These publications were the first to introduce the idea of strong focusing to particle beams, enabling the transition from compact circular accelerator concepts to separate-function magnet devices like synchrotrons, storage rings and particle colliders.

Biophysics
Schrödinger, E. W. (1944). What Is Life? The Physical Aspect of the Living Cell. Cambridge University Press. .
Turing, A. M. (1952). "The Chemical Basis of Morphogenesis". Philosophical Transactions of the Royal Society of London B. 237 (641): 37–72. doi:10.1098/rstb.1952.0012.

Cell

Mathematical

Medical

An influential graduate textbook in MRI by some of the principal advancers of the field.

Molecular

Neurophysics
 Describes the Hodgkin-Huxley model of action potentials in neurons.

Plant

Geophysics

English translation:  Republication of the 1893 unabridged and unaltered translation by Paul Fleury Mottelay.
Early description of magnetism from an Elizabethan scientist consisting of six books. Erroneously attributes magnetism as causing the motion of bodies in the Solar system.

A classic reference on the Earth's magnetic field and related topics in meteorology, solar and lunar physics, the aurora, techniques of spherical harmonic analysis and treatment of periodicities in geophysical data. Its comprehensive summaries made it the standard reference on geomagnetism and the ionosphere for at least 2 decades.

Up to date account of seismic data processing in the petroleum geophysics industry.

Physics of computation

Develops theory of a digital computer as an efficient universal computing device.

Plasma physics

These two volumes from Nobel Prize winning scientist Irving Langmuir, include his early published papers resulting from his experiments with ionized gases (i.e. plasma). The books summarise many of the basic properties of plasmas. Langmuir coined the word plasma in about 1928.

Hannes Alfvén won the Nobel Prize for his development of magnetohydrodynamics (MHD) the science that models plasma as fluids. This book lays down the ground work, but also shows that MHD may be inadequate for low-density plasmas such as space plasmas.

Astronomy and astrophysics

 Favoured the heliocentric model (first advanced by Aristarchus) over the Ptolemaic model of the solar system; sometimes credited with starting the Scientific Revolution in the Western world.

Provided strong arguments for heliocentrism and contributed valuable insight into the movement of the planets, including the first mention of their elliptical path and the change of their movement to the movement of free floating bodies as opposed to objects on rotating spheres (two of Kepler's laws). One of the most important works of the Scientific Revolution.

Developed the third of Kepler's laws.

Astrophysics

Astrophysics employs physical principles "to ascertain the nature of the heavenly bodies, rather than their positions or motions in space."

A landmark article of stellar physics, analysing several key processes that might be responsible for the synthesis of chemical elements in nature and their relative abundances; it is credited with originating what is now the theory of stellar nucleosynthesis.

Introduction of the Faber–Jackson law relating galaxy luminosity and velocity dispersion.

Introduction of the Tully–Fisher relation between galaxy luminosity and rotation-curve amplitude.

 Introduction of the M–sigma relation between black hole mass and galaxy velocity dispersion.

Cosmology

 Penzias, A.A.; Wilson, R.W. (1965) "A Measurement of Excess Antenna Temperature at 4080 Mc/s."  Discovery of cosmic microwave background radiation, early evidence for the big bang model. The authors were awarded the Nobel Prize in Physics for their joint works.

Introduced the conditions necessary for baryogenesis, by making use of recent results (discovery of CP violation, etc).

Reference textbook on cosmology, discussing both observational and theoretical issues.

 

Reported results from the COBE satellite, which was developed by NASA's Goddard Space Flight Center to measure the diffuse infrared and microwave radiation from the early universe to the limits set by our astrophysical environment. Measurements by a Far Infrared Absolute Spectrophotometer (FIRAS) confirmed that the cosmic microwave background (CMB) spectrum is that of a nearly perfect black body with a temperature of 2.725 ± 0.002 K. This observation matches the predictions of the hot Big Bang theory extraordinarily well, and indicates that nearly all of the radiant energy of the Universe was released within the first year after the Big Bang. The first paper presents initial results; the second, final results.

 

Presents results from the Differential Microwave Radiometer (DMR) on the COBE satellite. This maps the cosmic radiation and searches for variations in brightness. The CMB was found to have intrinsic "anisotropy" for the first time, at a level of a part in 100,000. These tiny variations in the intensity of the CMB over the sky show how matter and energy was distributed when the Universe was still very young. Later, through a process still poorly understood, the early structures seen by DMR developed into galaxies, galaxy clusters, and the large scale structure that we see in the Universe today. The first paper presents initial results; the second, final results.

 
Presents results from the Diffuse Infrared Background Experiment (DIRBE) on the COBE satellite. This searches for the cosmic infrared background radiation produced by the first galaxies. Infrared absolute sky brightness maps in the wavelength range 1.25 to 240 micrometres were obtained to carry out a search for the cosmic infrared background (CIB). The CIB was originally detected in the two longest DIRBE wavelength bands, 140 and 240 micrometres, and in the short-wavelength end of the FIRAS spectrum. Subsequent analyses have yielded detections of the CIB in the near-infrared DIRBE sky maps. The CIB represents a "core sample" of the Universe; it contains the cumulative emissions of stars and galaxies dating back to the epoch when these objects first began to form.

Atomic and molecular physics

James Clerk Maxwell reviewed this work in Nature and concluded that "there can be no doubt that the name of Van der Waals will soon be among the foremost in molecular science." Johannes Diderik van der Waals received the Nobel Prize in 1910 for his work on the equation of state for gases and liquids.
 
Discovery of X-rays, leading to the very first Nobel Prize in Physics for the author.
 
 The classic experimental measurement of the mass and charge of cathode ray "corpuscles", later called electrons. Won the Nobel Physics Prize (in 1906) for this discovery.

Zeeman (1897) papers
 
 
 
 Described the famous effect of splitting of spectral lines in magnetic fields; earned author a Nobel Physics prize citation (1902).

 Planck, Max (1901).
 See quantum mechanics section.
 Einstein, Albert (1905).
 See quantum mechanics section.
 Bohr, Niels (1913-4).
 See quantum mechanics section.
 
 This announced a law that gave decisive evidence for atomic number from studies of X-ray spectra, which could be explained by the Bohr model.
  Published earlier (1913) in Sitzungsberichten der Kgl. Preuss. Akad. d. Wiss.
 Described the famous effect of splitting of spectral lines in electric fields (c.f. Zeeman effect) as predicted by Voigt. Observed the same year (1913) as Lo Surdo; the work won a Nobel Physics prize for Stark.

Translated in  Also in Boorse, H.A., Motz, L. (1966). The world of the atom, edited with commentaries, Basic Books, Inc., New York, pp. 888–901.
 Formulated the concepts of spontaneous and stimulated emission.

 Arnold Sommerfeld (1919).
 See quantum mechanics section.

 
Description on an atomic ionization effect first discovered by Meitner, but named for the later discoverer, Auger.
 de Broglie, Louis (1924).
 See quantum mechanics section.
 Matrix mechanics papers: W. Heisenberg (1925), M. Born and P. Jordan (1925), M. Born, W. Heisenberg, and P. Jordan (1926).
 See quantum mechanics section.
 Schroedinger, E (1926).
 See quantum mechanics section.
 
Relates the experimental discovery of the inelastic scattering of light (predicted theoretically by A. Smekal in 1923) in liquids (with K. S. Krishnan), for which Raman receives the Nobel Prize in Physics in 1930. Observed independently soon after (in crystals) by G. Landsberg and L. I. Mandelstam.
 Herzberg, Gerhard (1939) Molecular Spectra and Molecular Structure I. Diatomic Molecules
 Herzberg, Gerhard (1945) Molecular Spectra and Molecular Structure II. Infrared and Raman Spectra of Polyatomic Molecules
 Herzberg, Gerhard (1966) Molecular Spectra and Molecular Structure III. Electronic Spectra of Polyatomic Molecules
This three-volume series is the classic detailed presentation of molecular spectroscopy for physicists and chemists. Herzberg received the 1971 Nobel Prize in Chemistry for his spectroscopic research on the electronic structure and geometry of molecules.

Classical mechanics

Classical mechanics is the system of physics begun by Isaac Newton and his contemporaries. It is concerned with the motion of macroscopic objects at speeds well below the speed of light.

Classic (first and original) English translation: 
Recent English translation: 

A three-volume work, often called Principia or Principia Mathematica. One of the most influential scientific books ever published, it contains the statement of Newton's laws of motion forming the foundation of classical mechanics as well as his law of universal gravitation. He derives Kepler's laws for the motion of the planets (which were first obtained empirically).

 Lagrange's masterpiece on mechanics and hydrodynamics. Based largely on the calculus of variations, this work introduced Lagrangian mechanics including the notion of virtual work, generalized coordinates, and the Lagrangian. Lagrange also further developed the principle of least action and introduced the Lagrangian reference frame for fluid flow.

Hamilton's papers.

These three papers used Hamilton's methods in optics to formulate mechanics anew; now called Hamiltonian mechanics.

Noether, Emmy (1918).
 See mathematical physics section.

 Kolmogorov-Arnol'd-Moser papers.
 Kolmogorov, A. N. "On Conservation of Conditionally Periodic Motions for a Small Change in Hamilton's Function." Dokl. Akad. Nauk SSSR 98, 527–530, 1954.
Moser, J. "On Invariant Curves of Area-Preserving Mappings of an Annulus." Nachr. Akad. Wiss. Göttingen Math.-Phys. Kl. II, 1-20, 1962.
 Arnol'd, V. I. "Proof of a Theorem of A. N. Kolmogorov on the Preservation of Conditionally Periodic Motions under a Small Perturbation of the Hamiltonian." Uspekhi Mat. Nauk 18, 13–40, 1963.
 Set of important results in dynamical systems theory of Hamiltonian systems, named the KAM theorem after the authors' initials. Regarded in retrospect as a sign of chaos theory.

A standard graduate textbook on classical mechanics, considered a good book on the subject.

Fluid dynamics

 Archimedes (ca. 250 BCE). "On Floating Bodies" (in ancient Greek, later tr. medieval Latin). Syracuse, Sicily. Partial preservation.
 Two-book treatise regarded as the founding text of fluid mechanics and hydrostatics in particular. Contains an introduction of his famous principle.

 Daniel Bernoulli (1738). Hydrodynamica, sive de viribus et motibus fluidorum commentarii (in Latin). Strasbourg. English translation: Hydrodynamics and Hydraulics by Daniel Bernoulli and Johann Bernoulli (Dover Publications, 1968).
 Established a unified approach to hydrostatics and hydraulics; study of efflux; Bernoulli's principle.

 Jean le Rond d'Alembert (1752). Essai d'une nouvelle théorie de la résistance des fluides (in French) [Essay of a new theory of resistance of fluids]. Paris.
 Introduces D'Alembert's paradox.

  (Presented in 1755)
 Formulates the theory of fluid dynamics in terms of a set of partial differential equations: Euler equations (fluid dynamics)

  (Presented in 1822)
 First formulation of the Navier–Stokes equations, albeit based on an incorrect molecular theory.

  (Presented in 1845)
 Correct formulation of the Navier–Stokes equations.

 
 Introduced the study of vortex dynamics (see Vorticity).

Introduces the dimensionless Reynolds number, investigating the critical Reynolds number for transition from laminar to turbulent flow.

  (Presented in 1904)
 Introduces the Boundary layer.

. Translated into English by 
Introduces a quantitative theory of turbulence.

Computational physics
 S. Ulam, R. D. Richtmyer, and J. von Neumann (1947). "Statistical methods in neutron diffusion"; LANL Scientific Laboratory report LAMS–551. Retrieved 2011-10-23.
This paper records the first use of the Monte Carlo method, created at Los Alamos.
 Metropolis, N.; et al. (1953)
 See statistical mechanics and thermodynamics section .
 Fermi, E.; Pasta, J.; Ulam, S. (1955) : "Studies of Nonlinear Problems" (accessed 25 Sep 2012). Los Alamos Laboratory Document LA-1940.
The Fermi-Ulam-Pasta-Tsingou simulation was an important early demonstration of the ability of computers to deal with nonlinear (physics) problems and its surprising result regarding thermal equipartition hinted towards chaos theory.

Molecular dynamics.

Car-Parrinello ab-initio molecular dynamics.

Condensed matter physics

Condensed matter physics deals with the physical properties of condensed phases of matter. These properties appear when atoms interact strongly and adhere to each other or are otherwise concentrated.
Kamerlingh Onnes, H., "Further experiments with liquid helium. C. On the change of electric resistance of pure metals at very low temperatures, etc. IV. The resistance of pure mercury at helium temperatures." Comm. Phys. Lab. Univ. Leiden; No. 120b, 1911.
Kamerlingh Onnes, H., "Further experiments with liquid helium. D. On the change of electric resistance of pure metals at very low temperatures, etc. V. The disappearance of the resistance of mercury." Comm. Phys. Lab. Univ. Leiden; No. 122b, 1911.
Kamerlingh Onnes, H., "Further experiments with liquid helium. G. On the electrical resistance of pure metals, etc. VI. On the sudden change in the rate at which the resistance of mercury disappears." Comm. Phys. Lab. Univ. Leiden; No. 124c, 1911.
Series of articles about superconductivity. 

 J. Bardeen, L. N. Cooper, and J. R. Schrieffer papers

These three papers develop the BCS theory of usual (not high ) superconductivity, relating the interaction of electrons and the phonons of a lattice. The authors were awarded the Nobel prize for this work.

Polymer physics

Contains the foundation of the kinetic theory of rubber elasticity, including the first theoretical description of statistical mechanics of polymers with application to viscosity and rubber elasticity, and an expression for the entropy gain during the coiling of linear flexible molecules.

Presented earlier by Guth at the American Chemical Society meeting of 1939, this article contains the first outline of the network theory of rubber elasticity. The resulting Guth-James equation of state is analogous to van der Waal's equation.

Presents a more detailed version of the network theory of rubber elasticity. The paper used average forces to some extent instead of thermodynamical functions. In statistical thermodynamics, these two procedures are equivalent. After some controversy within the literature, the James-Guth network theory is now generally accepted for larger extensions. See, e.g., Paul Flory's comments in Proc. Royal Soc. A. 351, 351 (1976).

Reissued:

Electromagnetism

William Gilbert (main author), Aaron Dowling, 1600.
 See geophysics section.

 Coulomb, C. A. (1785–89). Mémoires sur l'Électricité et le Magnétisme (In French; trans. Memoirs on Electricity and Magnetism), a series of seven memoirs.
 Contains descriptions empirical investigations into electricity. Established an empirical inverse-square law that would be named for him, by measuring the twist in a torsion balance. Cavendish would use a similar method to estimate the value of Newton's constant G.

 Introduced the Biot–Savart law, the magnetostatic analogue of Coulomb's law.

 Online links at Google eBooks (accessed 2010-09-26), and archived from the original at the Internet Archive.
 Introduced the famous eponymous law for electric current.
 Ohm, GS (1827). "Die galvanische Kette, mathematisch bearbeitet [tr., The Galvanic Circuit Investigated Mathematically]" (in German). TH Riemann, Berlin.
 Announced the now-famous circuital relation between voltage and current.
 Green, George (1828). "An Essay on the Application of Mathematical Analysis to the Theories of Electricity and Magnetism", Nottingham.
 Essay conceived several key ideas, among them a theorem similar to the modern Green's theorem, the idea of potential functions, and the concept of what are now called Green's functions.  This (initially obscure) work directly influenced the work of James Clerk Maxwell and William Thomson, among others.

Faraday's law of induction and research in electromagnetism.

The third of James Clerk Maxwell's papers concerned with electromagnetism. The concept of displacement current was introduced, so that it became possible to derive equations of electromagnetic wave. It was the first paper in which Maxwell's equations appeared.

 Hall, E.H. (1879). "On a New Action of the Magnet on Electric Currents". American Journal of Mathematics vol 2, p. 287-292. Thesis (PhD), Johns Hopkins U.
 Details an experimental analysis of voltaic effect later named for author.

The defining graduate-level introductory text. (First edition 1962)

A standard undergraduate introductory text.

General physics
Lev Landau, Evgeny Lifshitz (1st Russ. ed. 1940, 1st Eng. ed 1960). Course of Theoretical Physics.
 Important ten-volume textbook in theoretical physics methods.
Richard Feynman, Robert B. Leighton and Matthew Sands (1964). Feynman Lectures on Physics. Addison–Wesley.
 Bestselling three-volume textbook covering the span of physics. Reference for both (under)graduate student and professional researcher alike.

Mathematical physics

 Edwin Bidwell Wilson, 1901. "Vector Analysis: A text-book for the use of students of mathematics and physics, founded upon the lectures of J. Willard Gibbs Ph.D. LL.D." Free online copy. (Accessed 7 Dec 2012.)
Introduced the modern day notation of vector calculus, based on Gibbs' system.

Minkowski relativity papers (1907–15):
 See special relativity section.

Silberstein, Ludwik (1914)
 See special relativity section.

 Reprinted in: 
Contains a proof of Noether's Theorem (expressed as two theorems), showing that any symmetry of the Lagrangian corresponds to a conserved quantity. This result had a profound influence on 20th century theoretical physics.

 Eddington, Arthur (1923)
 See general relativity section.

Ising's 1924 thesis proving the non-existence of phase transitions in the 1-dimensional Ising model.

 , 2 vol.
  1st German edition 1924; current English edition April 1989, Print ; online .
  1st German edition 1937; current English edition: April 1989,. Print , online .
 Influential textbooks by two leading mathematicians of the early 20th century.

 Weyl, H.K.H. (1929). Elektron und Gravitation. I.  (in German)  Z. Phys. (56), 330.
 The establishment of gauge theory as an important mathematical tool in field theories, an idea first advanced (unsuccessfully) in 1918 by the same author.

 von Neumann, John (1932).
 See quantum mechanics section.

Rudolf Peierls' 1936 contour argument proving the existence of phase transitions in higher dimensional Ising models.

 
Introduced Dirac notation as a standard notation for describing denote abstract vector spaces and linear functionals in quantum mechanics and mathematics, though the notation has precursors in Grassmann nearly 100 years previously.

C. N. Yang, R. Mills (1954)
 See quantum field theory section.

Thorough introduction to the mathematical methods of classical mechanics, electromagnetic theory, quantum theory and general relativity. Possibly more accessible than Morse and Feshbach.

Proved the existence of phase transitions of continuous symmetry models in at least 3 dimensions.

Pre-Modern (Classical) mathematical physics

Galilei, Galileo (1638)
 See classical mechanics section.

 Newton, Isaac (1687)
 See classical mechanics section.

 Lagrangia, Giuseppe Ludovico (1788)
 See classical mechanics section.

 Fourier, J-B.J (1807). Mémoire sur la propagation de la chaleur dans les corps solides [Memoir on the propagation of heat in solid bodies] (in French).
 Considered a founding text in the field of Fourier analysis (and by extension harmonic analysis), and a breakthrough for the solution of the classic (partial) differential equations of mathematical physics.

Hamilton, William Rowan (1828–37)
See optics section.

 English translation by Freeman (1878), with editorial 'corrections'.  Revised French edition, Darboux (ed.) (1888), with many editorial corrections.
Contains a discussion of Fourier(1807) and annunciation of Fourier's law.

 Green, George (1828).
See electromagnetism section.

Hamilton, William Rowan (1834–1835)
See classical mechanics section.

Clerk Maxwell, James (1861,1865)
See electromagnetism section.

Nonlinear dynamics and chaos

Kolmogorov-Arnol'd-Moser papers.
See classical mechanics section.

Fermi, E.; Pasta, J.; Ulam, S. (1955)
 See computational physics section.

A finite system of deterministic nonlinear ordinary differential equations is introduced to represent forced dissipative hydrodynamic flow, simulating simple phenomena in the real atmosphere. All of the solutions are found to be unstable, and most of them nonperiodic, thus forcing to reevaluate the feasibility of long-term weather prediction. In this paper the Lorenz attractor is presented for the first time, and gave the first hint of what is now known as butterfly effect.

Optics

 (Arabic: Kitab al-Manazir, Latin: De Aspectibus) – a seven volume treatise on optics and physics, written by Ibn al-Haytham (Latinized as Alhacen or Alhazen in Europe), and published in 1021.

 
 The first major publication of the Royal Society. It generated a wide public interest in, and often is considered the creator of, the science of microscopy. Also notable for coining the term "biological cell".

Huygens attained a remarkably clear understanding of the principles of wave-propagation; and his exposition of the subject marks an epoch in the treatment of Optical problems. Not appreciated until much later due to the mistaken zeal with which formerly everything that conflicted with the cherished ideas of Newton was denounced by his followers.

This posthumous publication contains the law of refraction (now known as "Snell's law) and was partly based on unpublished observations that Willebrord Snellius made and wrote in 1621.

 (available online)
 A key publication in the history of physics, arguably Newton's second most influential physics publication after Principia. Within he describes his famous experiments regarding colour and light, and ends with a set of queries about the nature of light and matter.

 Seminal text (regarded as polemical for its time) that influenced later research on human visual and colour perception, from an author usually remembered for his literary work.

Work by Thomas Young and Fresnel provided a comprehensive picture of the propagation of light.

 Hamiltonian geometrical optics. Theory of Systems of Rays and three supplements. Reissued in 
 
——. "Supplement to an Essay on the Theory of Systems of Rays" (Transactions of the Royal Irish Academy, volume 16, part 1 (1830), pp. 1–61.)
——. "Second Supplement to an Essay on the Theory of Systems of Rays" (Transactions of the Royal Irish Academy, volume 16, part 2 (1831), pp. 93–125.)
——. "Third Supplement to an Essay on the Theory of Systems of Rays" (Transactions of the Royal Irish Academy, volume 17 (1837), pp. 1–144.)
 A series of papers recording Hamilton's work in geometric optics. This would later become an inspiration for Hamiltonian mechanics.
Maxwell, James Clerk (1861), (1865).
 See electromagnetism section.

These three papers introduced the Frequency comb technique. The earlier presented the main idea but last is the one often cited.

Nuclear and particle physics

Nuclear physics

 Reported the accidental discovery of a new kind of radiation. Awarded the 1903 Nobel Prize in Physics for this work.
Rutherford, E. (2004; first ed. 1904). Radio-activity. Courier Dover Publications, 399 pages. , 9780486495859.

 Gives an account of the author's discovery of high energy cosmic radiation. Awarded half of the 1936 Nobel Prize in Physics.
 Neutron discovery.

Chadwick's experiments confirmed the identity of the mysterious particle detected independently by Joliot-Curie & Joliot, and Bothe & Becker and predicted by Majorana and others to be a neutral nucleon in 1932, for which Chadwick was awarded the Nobel Prize in Physics in 1935.

 . In Italian.
 Introduced a theory of beta decay, which first appeared in 1933. The article was later translated into German, and much later English, having been refused publication in Nature. This was later influential in understanding the weak nuclear force. 
Bethe Nuclear Physics papers

A series of three articles by Hans Bethe summarizing the knowledge in the subject of Nuclear Physics at the time of publication. The set of three articles is colloquially referred to as "Bethe's bible".

This contains an account of an experiment first suggested by Wang, confirming the existence of a particle (the neutrino, more precisely the electron neutrino) first predicted by Pauli in 1940; a result that was rewarded almost forty years later with the 1995 Nobel Prize for Reines.

 Wu et al. (1957)
See particle physics section.
Fowler et al. (1957). 
See astrophysics section.

Particle physics

 Thomson, JJ (1897).
 See the atomic and molecular physics section.
Hess, V. F. (1912).
 See the nuclear physics section.

 Experimental detection of the positron verifying the prediction from the Dirac equation, for which Anderson won the Nobel Physics prize in 1936. See also: 
 Fermi, E. (1934).
 See the nuclear physics section.
 J. C. Street and E. C. Stevenson. "New Evidence for the Existence of a Particle Intermediate Between the Proton and Electron", Phys. Rev. 52, 1003 (1937).
Experimental confirmation of a particle first discovered by Anderson and Neddermeyer at Caltech in 1936; originally thought to be Yukawa's meson, but later shown to be a "heavy electron", now called muon.

 Cowan et al. (1956)
 See the nuclear physics section.

 
 An important experiment (based on a theoretical analysis by Lee and Yang) that proved that parity conservation was disobeyed by the weak force, later confirmed by another group in the same year. This won Lee and Yang the Nobel Prize in Physics for 1957.

Sakharov, A. D. (1967).
See cosmology section.

Standard undergraduate particle physics textbook.

Quantum mechanics

 For relevant publications before 1900, see atomic and molecular physics section.

Introduced Planck's law of black body radiation in an attempt to interpolate between the Rayleigh–Jeans law (which worked at long wavelengths) and Wien's law (which worked at short wavelengths). He found that the above function fit the data for all wavelengths remarkably well. This paper is considered to be the beginning of quantum theory and discovery of photon.

English translations:
"On a Heuristic Point of View about the Creation and Conversion of Light". Translated by Dirk ter Haar
"On a Heuristic Point of View about the Creation and Conversion of Light. Translated by Wikisource
 Introduced the concept of light quanta (called photons today) to explain the photoelectric effect. Cited for Nobel Physics Prize (1921). Part of the Annus Mirabilis papers.

Bohr model papers:

 Introduced the Bohr model of the (hydrogen) atom, which later formed the foundation for the more sophisticated atomic shell model of larger atoms.

 
 An experiment on the electrical conductivity of gases that supported the conclusions of the Bohr model.

Arnold Sommerfeld (1919). Atombau und Spektrallinien. Friedrich Vieweg und Sohn, Braunschweig' .
Arnold Sommerfeld, translated from the third German edition by Henry L. Brose Atomic Structure and Spectral Lines (Methuen, 1923)
 Added a relativisitic correction to Bohr's model achieved in 1916, by Sommerfeld. Together with Planck (1901), Einstein (1905) and Bohr model (1913) considered stanchion of old quantum theory.

 This important experiment on a beam of particles through a magnetic field described the experimental observation that their deflection takes only certain quantized values was important in leading to the concept of a new quantum number, spin.

 de Broglie, Louis (1924). Recherches sur la théorie des quanta (in French) (Researches on the theory of quanta), Thesis, Paris. Ann. de Physique (10) 3, 22 (1925)
 Introduced formally the concept of the de Broglie wavelength to support hypothesis of wave particle duality.

Matrix mechanics papers:
W. Heisenberg (1925), Über quantentheoretische Umdeutung kinematischer und mechanischer Beziehungen (in German), Zeitschrift für Physik, 33, 879-893 (received July 29, 1925). [English translation in: B. L. van der Waerden, editor, Sources of Quantum Mechanics (Dover Publications, 1968)  (English title: Quantum-Theoretical Re-interpretation of Kinematic and Mechanical Relations).]
M. Born and P. Jordan (1925), Zur Quantenmechanik (in German), Zeitschrift für Physik, 34, 858-888 (received September 27, 1925). [English translation in: B. L. van der Waerden, editor, Sources of Quantum Mechanics (Dover Publications, 1968)  (English title: On Quantum Mechanics).]
M. Born, W. Heisenberg, and P. Jordan (1926), Zur Quantenmechanik II (in German), Zeitschrift für Physik, 35, 557–615, (received November 16, 1925). [English translation in: B. L. van der Waerden, editor, Sources of Quantum Mechanics (Dover Publications, 1968)  (English title: On Quantum Mechanics II).]
 These three papers (die Dreimaennerarbeit) formulated matrix mechanics, the first successful (non-relativistic) theory of quantum mechanics.

 Wave mechanics papers.
Schroedinger, E (1926). "Quantisierung als Eigenwertproblem" [German; tr. "Quantization as an Eigenvalue Problem"]. Four communications (Ger Mitteilungen).
  Key: citeulike:4768943. Alternate URL,  from the original.
  pp.  489–527, (1926). Alternate URL,  from the original.
  pp.  437–490, (1926).  from the original.
 pp.  109–139, (1926).  from the original.

These papers introduce the wave-mechanical description of the atom (Ger Wellenmechanik; not to be confused with classical wave mechanics), inspired by the wave–particle duality hypotheses of Einstein (1905) and de Broglie (1924), among others. This was only the second fully adequate formulation of (non-relativistic) quantum theory. Introduced the now famous equation named after the author.

 Formulates the uncertainty principle as a key concept in quantum mechanics.

 (conference abstract)  (full paper)
 Performed an experiment (with Lester Germer) which observed Bragg X-ray diffraction patterns from slow electrons; later independently replicated by Thomson, for which Davisson and Thomson shared the Nobel Prize in Physics in 1937. This confirmed de Broglie's hypothesis that matter has wave-like behaviour; in combination with the Compton effect discovered by Arthur Compton (who won the Nobel Prize for Physics in 1927), established the wave–particle duality hypothesis as a fundamental concept in quantum theory.

Quantum mechanics as explained by one of the founders of the field, Paul Dirac. First edition published on 29 May 1930. The second to last chapter is particularly interesting because of its prediction of the positron.

Mathematical Foundations of Quantum Mechanics, Beyer, R. T., trans., Princeton Univ. Press. 1996 edition: .
Rigorous axiomatic formulation of quantum mechanics as explained by one of the greatest pure and applied mathematicians in modern history. In this book all the modern mathematical machinery to deal with quantum theories, such as the general notion of Hilbert space, that of self-adjoint operator and a complete general version of the spectral theory for self-adjoint unbounded operators, was introduced for the first time.

Feynman, R P (1942). "The Principle of Least Action in Quantum Mechanics". Ph.D. Dissertation, Princeton University. Reprinted as Laurie M. Brown ed., (with title Feynman's Thesis: a New Approach to Quantum Theory). World Scientific, 2005. .
The earliest record of the (complete) path integral formalism, a Lagrangian formulation of quantum mechanics, anticipated by ideas from Dirac, via the Wiener integral.

Quantum field theory

 Klein and Gordon papers:

 
 The publications formulate what became known as the Klein–Gordon equation as the first relativistically invariant Schrödinger equation (however the equation was considered contemporaneously by Schrödinger - in his personal notes - and Fock, among others).

Dirac equation:
 
 
 In these papers, Dirac formulates and derives the Dirac equation, which won him a Nobel Prize (1933) in Physics.

 Introduction of the Feynman diagrams approach to quantum electrodynamics.

 Extended the concept of gauge theory for abelian groups, e.g. quantum electrodynamics, to nonabelian groups to provide an explanation for strong interactions by use of what are now known as the Yang–Mills equations.
Electroweak unification papers:
 
 
 
Combined the electromagnetic and weak interactions (through the use of the Higgs mechanism) into an electro-weak theory, and won the trio the Nobel Physics Prize (1979). Also seen as a step towards the Standard Model of particle physics.

 Higgs et al. 1964 papers:

 Collectively these three papers (called the 1964 PRL symmetry breaking papers) formulated the concept of the Higgs mechanism. Also important later work done by t'Hooft.
 Gross, Wilczek & Politzer 1973 papers: 

 Won the three researchers the Nobel Physics (2004) prize for the prediction of asymptotic freedom.

Standard graduate textbook in quantum field theory.

Relativity

Special

The primary sources section of the latter article in particular contains many additional (early) publications of importance in the field.

For a translation see: https://en.wikisource.org/wiki/Translation:The_Relative_Motion_of_the_Earth_and_the_Aether. Hendrik Lorentz was a major influence on Einstein's theory of special relativity. Lorentz laid the fundamentals for the work by Einstein and the theory was originally called the Lorentz-Einstein theory. After 1905 Lorentz wrote several papers on what he called "Einstein's principle of relativity".

 "On the Electrodynamics of Moving Bodies". Translation by George Barker Jeffery and Wilfrid Perrett in The Principle of Relativity, London: Methuen and Company, Ltd. (1923)
 "On the Electrodynamics of Moving Bodies". Translation by Megh Nad Saha in The Principle of Relativity: Original Papers by A. Einstein and H. Minkowski, University of Calcutta, 1920, pp. 1–34:
Introduced the special theory of relativity. Reconciled Maxwell's equations for electricity and magnetism with the laws of mechanics by introducing major changes to mechanics close to the speed of light. One of the Annus Mirabilis papers.

English translations:
 "Does the Inertia of a Body Depend Upon Its Energy Content?". Translation by George Barker Jeffery and Wilfrid Perrett in The Principle of Relativity, London: Methuen and Company, Ltd. (1923).
Used the newly formed special relativity to introduce the famous mass energy formula. One of the Annus Mirabilis papers.

Minkowski relativity papers:
 
 
English translation: The Fundamental Equations for Electromagnetic Processes in Moving Bodies. In: The Principle of Relativity (1920), Calcutta: University Press, 1-69

 Translation by Meghnad Saha, "Space and Time" (1920): Wikisource link.
 Introduced the four-vector notation and the notion of Minkowski space, which was later adopted by Einstein and others.

 
Used concepts developed in the then-current textbooks (e.g., vector analysis and non-Euclidean geometry) to provide entry into mathematical physics with a vector-based introduction to quaternions and a primer on matrix notation for linear transformations of 4-vectors. The ten chapters are composed of 4 on kinematics, 3 on quaternion methods, and 3 on electromagnetism. Silberstein used biquaternions to develop Minkowski space and Lorentz transformations. The second edition published in 1924 extended relativity into gravitation theory with tensor methods, but was superseded by Eddington's text.

 
A modern introduction to special relativity, that explains well how the choice to divide spacetime into a time part and a space part is no different than two choices about how to assign coordinates to the surface of the earth.

General

 This publication is the first complete account of a general relativistic theory.

Einstein considered this the finest description of the theory of relativity in any language.

A book on gravitation, often considered the "Bible" on gravitation by researchers. Published by W.H. Freeman and Company in 1973. It covers all aspects of the General Theory of Relativity and also considers some extensions and experimental confirmation. It is divided into two "tracks", the second of which covers more advanced topics. Its massive size (over 1200 pages) has inspired nicknames such as "the phone book".

Statistical mechanics and thermodynamics

Observations of the generation of heat during the boring of cannons led Rumford to reject the caloric theory and to contend that heat was a form of motion.

  Google eBook. English translation by Freeman (1878), with editorial 'corrections'.  Revised French edition, Darboux (ed.) (1888), with many editorial corrections. 
 A founding text in the field of Fourier analysis, and a breakthrough for the solution of the classic (partial) differential equations of mathematical physics. Contains an annunciation of Fourier's law.

 (full text of 1897 ed.))

 Reprinted in:

Between 1876 and 1878 Gibbs wrote a series of papers collectively entitled "On the Equilibrium of Heterogeneous Substances", considered one of the greatest achievements in physical science in the 19th century and the foundation of the science of physical chemistry. In these papers Gibbs applied thermodynamics to the interpretation of physicochemical phenomena and showed the explanation and interrelationship of what had been known only as isolated, inexplicable facts. Gibbs' papers on heterogeneous equilibria included: some chemical potential concepts; some free energy concepts; a Gibbsian ensemble ideal (basis of the statistical mechanics field); and a phase rule.

 
 Online PDF copy.
 In this publication Einstein covered his study of Brownian motion, and provided empirical evidence for the existence of atoms. Part of the Annus Mirabilis papers.

Ising, Ernst (1924), (1925).
 See mathematical physics section.

Peierls, R.; Born, M. (1936).
 See mathematical physics section.

  Online article: accessed 3 May 2012.
 Introduces the Metropolis Monte Carlo method with periodic boundary conditions and applies it to the numerical simulation of a fluid.

 Fermi, E.; Pasta, J.; Ulam, S. (1955)
 See computational physics section.

Introduces the real space view on the renormalization group, and explains using this concept some relations between the scaling exponents of the Ising model.

Application of the renormalization group to the solution of the Kondo problem. The author was awarded the Nobel Prize in 1982 for this work.

See also
 Outline of physics

References

Further reading

External links
 TrivialAnomaly.com, links to historic physics papers
Heralds of Science: Physics, collection at the Smithsonian Institution

Publications in physics
Physics
Publications in physics
Publications in physics
Publications in physics